Jess C. Denious (July 14, 1879 – December 1, 1953) served as Lieutenant Governor of Kansas from 1943 until 1947.

Early life
Denious was born in Mogadore, Ohio to Oliver and Martha Denious. The family moved to Kansas at the age of five, first living in Galesburg before moving to Erie. He moved to Colorado for a year before attending Drake University. Denious transferred to Baker University and graduated from there in 1905.

Career 
Denious worked for the Ottawa Herald and co-owned the Erie Record from 1906 until 1909. He acquired the Globe-Republican in 1910, changing its name to the Dodge City Daily Globe. Denious would continue as publisher until his death.

Denious served as a delegate to the 1924 Republican National Convention. He was elected to the Kansas Senate in 1932 from the 37th district, which was later renumbered the 35th, serving until 1941. Denious was elected lieutenant governor in 1942, serving under Governor Andrew Frank Schoeppel. He died in Dodge City in 1953.

Family 
Denious married Juliet Pettijohn in 1915. He had two children; Martha (1919–2017) and Jess Jr. (1928–1969).

References

External links
 

1879 births
1953 deaths
20th-century American newspaper publishers (people)
Baker University alumni
Drake University alumni
Republican Party Kansas state senators
Lieutenant Governors of Kansas
People from Dodge City, Kansas
People from Mogadore, Ohio
20th-century American politicians